Colpoclypeus is a genus of hymenopteran insects of the family Eulophidae.

Species
 Colpoclypeus florus (Walker, 1839)
 Colpoclypeus michoacanensis Sanchez & Figueroa, 2011

References

 Sanchez-Garcia, J.A., Pineda, S., Martinez, A.M., Rebollar-Alviter, A., Juarez-Gutierrez, A.C., Cruz, I.L., La Salle, J., & Figueroa, J.I. (2011). "A new species of Colpoclypeus Lucchese (Hymenoptera: Eulophidae) from Mexico." Zootaxa 2830: 64–68.
 Key to Nearctic eulophid genera 
 Universal Chalcidoidea Database

Eulophidae